The men's light middleweight event was part of the boxing programme at the 1960 Summer Olympics. The weight class allowed boxers of up to 71 kilograms to compete. The competition was held from 25 August to 5 September 1960. 23 boxers from 23 nations competed.

Competition format

The competition was a straight single-elimination tournament, with no bronze medal match (two bronze medals were awarded, one to each semifinal loser).

Results
Results of the light middleweight boxing competition.

Top half

Bottom half

Finals

References

Light Middleweight